The Northwestern School of Law of Lewis and Clark College (also known as Lewis & Clark Law School), is an American Bar Association-approved private law school in Portland, Oregon.

The law school received ABA approval in 1970 and joined the Association of American Law Schools (AALS) in 1973.

Lewis & Clark Law School offers the Juris Doctor (J.D.) degree, including a range of scholastic concentrations and legal certificate programs, as well as a Master of Laws (LLM) degree in environmental, natural resources, and energy law and an LLM degree in animal law.

Each class in the three-year J.D. program has approximately 180 students. The dean of Lewis & Clark Law School is Jennifer J. Johnson, Erskine Wood Sr. endowed Professor of Law,  a   securities law scholar and arbitration expert, as well as a member of the American Law Institute.

Lewis & Clark law students can complete their degrees on full-time or part-time schedules, take courses during the day or evening, and focus in a number of legal specialties. The institution has a  general law review and a range of  specialty programs, including environmental law, public interest law, and the lawyering program. According to Lewis & Clark's official 2018 ABA-required disclosures, 75.8% of the Class of 2018 obtained full-time, long-term, JD-required or JD-preferred employment nine months after graduation.

Campus grounds
The law school grounds are adjacent to a forested natural area, replete with 14-miles of biking and jogging trails in Tryon Creek State Park. The Law School is 4-miles from downtown, in the Southern hills of Portland, west of the Willamette River, at the base of the undergraduate campus of Lewis & Clark College.

The Lewis & Clark College undergraduate, graduate school, and law campus grounds collectively occupy 137 acres (554,000 m²), centered on the M. Lloyd Frank Estate on Palatine Hill in the Collins View neighborhood of Southwest Portland.

History
Lewis & Clark Law School's origins began with the University of Oregon establishing a Department of Law in Portland in 1885. After the Oregon State Legislature moved the program to Eugene, Oregon in 1915, several law faculty members resisted the move, and formed the Northwestern College of Law.

In 1965, the faculty and overseers of Northwestern College of Law joined with the president and trustees of Lewis & Clark College to incorporate the Northwestern School of Law of Lewis & Clark College. Harold G. Wren was Dean of the law school from 1969-72.

Today the college has over 100 faculty and staff. Faculty members regularly appear as experts in legal proceedings, publish legal texts and contribute primary research findings to legal scholarship around the country.

Law library

The Paul L. Boley Law Library is the largest law library in Oregon and the second-largest in the Pacific Northwest with a collection of over 505,000 volumes as of 2014. Boley is also home to clinical space and program offices.

Animal Law Program
Lewis & Clark Law School is a pioneer in the field of animal law, it offered some of the first animal law courses in the world and in 1992 students founded the first Animal Law Conference in the U.S. The Center for Animal Studies (CALS) was founded at the school in 2008, becoming the first formal animal law program in the world and eventually giving rise to the first Animal Law Clinic. In 2012 CALS launched the first post-JD master of laws (LLM) in Animal Law.
The school has the top ranked animal law program in the United States.

Rankings
The 2021 U.S. News & World Report ranked the school at 88 as a Tier 1 institution. Individual programs continue to receive high marks: Lewis & Clark Law School's Animal Law Program is ranked 1st in the United States and as of 2021, it ranked 1st of environmental law programs, according to U.S. News & World Report'''s rating system. 
Meanwhile, the Lewis & Clark Part-Time Program was ranked 14th in the country as of 2021.

Law centers and institutes

Center for Animal Law Studies
Earthrise Law Center
Green Energy Institute
National Crime Victim Law Institute
Natural Resources Law Institute
Northwest Environmental Defense Center (NEDC)
Western Resources Legal Center (WRLC)
International Environmental Law Project (IELP)

Journals

Lewis & Clark Law School supports three student-edited scholarly journals:Environmental Law ReviewAnimal Law ReviewLewis & Clark Law Review''

Practical skills

National moot court competitions
Lewis & Clark law students benefit from the campus serving as a destination for several national moot courts. In 2013, Chief Justice of the United States John G. Roberts launched Lewis & Clark's Environmental Moot Court Competition, presiding as a guest judge. 

The campus also serves as the permanent host of the National Native American Law Students Association (NALSA) Moot Court Competition and the International Law Students Association (ILSA) Pacific Regional Philip C. Jessup International Law Moot Court Competition. Additionally, the ILSA Student Initiated Lecture Series at Lewis & Clark has been internationally recognized for academic excellence.

Semester abroad opportunities
In addition, the law school has developed a number of exclusive global summer externship placements. There are options in India for students interested in business, litigation, transactional, public interest, human rights, and environmental practice through placement with firms and NGOs in Delhi, Hyderabad, and Mumbai.
The law school has also secured exclusive placements in Asia, for students interested in international law firm experience. Past placements include firms in both Beijing and Shanghai, China.

Employment 
According to Lewis & Clark's official 2018 ABA-required disclosures, 75.8% of the Class of 2018 obtained full-time, long-term, JD-required or JD-preferred employment nine months after graduation. Lewis & Clark's Law School Transparency under-employment score is 20.8%, indicating the percentage of the Class of 2018 unemployed, pursuing an additional degree, or working in a non-professional, short-term, or part-time job nine months after graduation.

Costs
The average cost of attendance at Lewis & Clark Law School for the 2016-17 school year includes tuition ($43,240 full-time, $32,426 part-time); fees ($50 public interest fee); health insurance ($2,402 if not already covered); and average cost of living expenses ($18,761).

Notable alumni

Brad Avakian (1990): Commissioner of the Oregon Bureau of Labor and Industries 
Richard C. Baldwin (1975): Oregon Supreme Court Justice 
Alexander G. Barry (1915): Politician 
Cliff Bentz (1979): Oregon State Representative 
Craig Berkman: Politician
Earl Blumenauer (1976): U.S. Representative 
Anna Brown (1980): U.S. District Judge for the District of Oregon  
Kate Brown (1985): Governor of Oregon 
Dean Bryson (1934): Oregon Supreme Court Justice 
Beatrice Morrow Cannady (1922): Portland civil rights activist, newspaper editor
Robin Kundis Craig (1996): Environmental law scholar  
Charles Crookham (1951): Oregon Attorney General 
Mercedes Deiz (1959): First black woman to practice law in Oregon, Circuit Court Judge 
Sim Gill: District Attorney for Salt Lake County, Utah  
John Hubert Hall (1926): Governor of Oregon 
Heidi Heitkamp (1980): former U.S. Senator and former North Dakota Attorney General 
Ralph Holman (1937): Oregon Supreme Court Justice 
Betsy Johnson (1977): Oregon State Senator 
Donald C. Johnson (1974): U.S. Ambassador to Cape Verde and Mongolia 
Robert E. Jones (1953): U.S. District Judge for the District of Oregon  
Nick Kahl (2009): Oregon State Representative 
Garr King (1963): U.S. District Judge for the District of Oregon  
Jack Landau (1980): Oregon Supreme Court Justice 
Ronald A. Marks (1979): Former senior CIA official
Michael J. McShane (1988): U.S. District Judge for the District of Oregon  
Jake Metcalfe (1990): Politician
Clay Meyers: Oregon Secretary of State
Owen M. Panner: Politician
Wayne M. Perry (1975): Businessman, International Commissioner of the Boy Scouts of America, minority owner of the Seattle Mariners 
Betty Roberts (1966): first female Oregon Supreme Court Justice 
Peter Robinson (1978): International Criminal Court lawyer
Phil Schiliro (1981): assistant to the President and Director of Legislative Affairs for President Obama 
Mildred Schwab (1939): one of the first women to study law 
Leonard Shoen (1955): U-Haul Company Founder 
Mary Jane Spurlin: Oregon's first female judge 
Lou Savage (1974): Legal Reform Advocate 
Gail Shibley (2009): Politician
Bernard Zaleha (1987): Sierra Club National Board of Directors(2003-2009) and National Vice President (2004-2006)

References

External links 
Lewis & Clark Law School (official website)

1915 establishments in Oregon
Educational institutions established in 1915
Environmental law schools
Law schools in Oregon
Lewis & Clark College
Natural resources law